Bolton is the primary village and a census-designated place (CDP) in the town of Bolton, Chittenden County, Vermont, United States. It was first listed as a CDP prior to the 2020 census.

The village is in eastern Chittenden County, on the north side of the valley of the Winooski River as it cuts through the center of the Green Mountains. The village is located along U.S. Route 2, which leads east  to Waterbury and west  to Richmond. Interstate 89 forms the northern edge of the community; the nearest access is from Exit 10 at Waterbury or Exit 11 at Richmond.

References 

Populated places in Chittenden County, Vermont
Census-designated places in Chittenden County, Vermont
Census-designated places in Vermont